William Séry (born 20 March 1988) is a Martiniquais professional footballer who plays as a centre-back for FC Fleury 91.

Club career
A long time footballer in the lower divisions of France, Séry made his professional debut for Quevilly-Rouen in a Ligue 2 1–1 tie with FC Lorient on 29 July 2017.

Séry joined FC Fleury 91 ahead of the 2019–20 season in June 2019.

International career
Séry represented Martinique national team at the 2013 Gold Cup.

References

External links
 
 
 
 

Living people
1988 births
French people of Martiniquais descent
Martiniquais footballers
French footballers
Footballers from Paris
Martinique international footballers
Association football central defenders
Ligue 2 players
Championnat National players
Championnat National 2 players
Championnat National 3 players
TFF First League players
US Raon-l'Étape players
US Quevilly-Rouen Métropole players
Giresunspor footballers
FC Fleury 91 players
French expatriate footballers
French expatriate sportspeople in Turkey
Expatriate footballers in Turkey